Testem benevolentiae nostrae is an apostolic letter written by Pope Leo XIII to Cardinal James Gibbons, Archbishop of Baltimore, dated January 22, 1899. In it, the pope addressed a heresy he called Americanism, and expressed his concern that the Catholic Church in the United States should guard against American values of liberalism and pluralism undermining the doctrine of the Church.

Background 

Testem benevolentiae nostrae translates as "Witness to Our Good Will." The Pope was concerned about the culture of Catholics in the United States, in response to the preface of the French translation of the biography of Isaac Thomas Hecker. Hecker's biography reached France eleven years after Father Hecker had died (in good standing with the Church), and its French translation included a liberal preface by Abbé Félix Klein. Leo proposed to review certain opinions expressed by the translator in the book about Isaac Hecker. In particular: The Church should adapt to the new advanced civilization and relax her disciplines regarding not only the rule of life but also the deposit of faith, passing-over or minimizing certain points of doctrine, or giving to them a new meaning which the Church had never held.

Substance

Rejection of American particularism
Testem benevolentiae nostrae involved American particularism and view of individual liberty. On particularism it was believed that a movement of American Catholics felt they were a special case who needed greater latitude in order to assimilate into a majority Protestant nation. The letter rejected the idea of "some who conceive and would have the Church in America to be different from what it is in the rest of the world.

The letter actually had more to do with Catholics in France than those in the United States. French conservatives were appalled at Abbé Klein's remarks in a book about an American priest, and claimed that a number of the American Catholic clergy shared these views.

He expresses concern lest Americans would value their freedom and individualism so much they would reject the idea of monasteries and the priesthood. "Did not your country, the United States, derive the beginnings both of faith and of culture from the children of these religious families?"

It was not uncommon for American bishops, finding themselves having to provide education and health care to large numbers of immigrants, pointedly solicited congregations involved in those activities. Leo cautioned against valuing an active apostolate more than a contemplative one. "Nor should any difference of praise be made between those who follow the active state of life and those others who, charmed with solitude, give themselves to prayer and bodily mortification."

Negative view of freedom of the press
In November 1892 at a meeting of the archbishops held in New York City, Bishop Francesco Satolli, soon to be the first Apostolic delegate to the United States, presented fourteen propositions regarding the solution of certain school problems which had been for some time under discussion. The draft propositions were "inopportunely" published, with incorrect interpretations and malign insinuations in some papers, causing a good deal of "acrid" discussion.

Testem benevolentiae nostrae clearly rejects full freedom of the press:"These dangers, viz., the confounding of license with liberty, the passion for discussing and pouring contempt upon any possible subject, the assumed right to hold whatever opinions one pleases upon any subject and to set them forth in print to the world, have so wrapped minds in darkness that there is now a greater need of the Church's teaching office than ever before, lest people become unmindful both of conscience and of duty."

Gibbons' response
The brief did not assert that Hecker and the Americans had held any unsound doctrine.  Instead, it merely stated that if such opinions did exist, the Pope called upon the hierarchy to eradicate them. Cardinal Gibbons and many other prelates replied to Rome. With a near-unanimous voice, they declared that the incriminated opinions had no existence among American Catholics. Hecker never had countenanced the slightest departure from Catholic principles in their fullest and most strict application. The disturbance caused by the condemnation was slight; almost the entire laity and a considerable part of the clergy were unaware of this affair. However, the pope's brief did end up strengthening the position of the conservatives in France.

Legacy and influence

John L. Allen Jr. believes the letter was really directed at liberal currents in France.

See also
Syllabus of Errors

References

Further reading 

Catholic Encyclopedia article on the letter
Michael W. Cuneo on the letter

External links

Translation of Testem benevolentiae nostrae

Documents of Pope Leo XIII
History of Catholicism in the United States
History of Catholicism in France
Religion and politics
1899 documents
1899 in Christianity
January 1899 events